Julington Creek is a stream in Duval County, Florida, near Jacksonville. Durbin Creek is a tributary.  Julington Creek feeds into the St Johns River widening out into Old Bull Bay. Both are navigable by paddlecraft and has a marina on it.

Harriet Beecher Stowe wrote about her visits to the creek while she was living in Mandarin, Florida, in Palmetto Leaves (1873).

History
An account of Florida from 1837 describes settlements in an area of the creek. There was a ferry across the creek.

Developments
The Bartram Canoe Trail runs from Durbin Creek to Julington Creek. State Road 13 has a bridge over the creek.

There is a Julington Durbin Creek Preserve. There is also a Julington Creek Elementary School and the community of Julington Creek Plantation.

History
Land along the creek was subject to claims in the late 18th century.

References

Rivers of Florida
Bodies of water of Duval County, Florida